The European Education and Culture Executive Agency (formerly the Education, Audiovisual and Culture Executive Agency), or EACEA, is an executive agency of the European Commission located in Brussels, Belgium. It manages parts of the European Commission's funding programmes in education, culture, media, sport, youth, citizenship and humanitarian aid. EACEA has been operational since January 2006.

Organisation
EACEA is supervised by six Directorates-General of the European Commission: 
 Education, Youth, Sport and Culture (DG EAC)
 Communications Networks, Content and Technology (DG CNECT)
 Justice and Consumers (DG JUST)
 International Partnerships (DG INTPA)
 Neighbourhood and Enlargement Negotiations (DG NEAR)
 Employment, Social Affairs & Inclusion (DG EMPL)

Under the EU long-term budget for 2021-2027, EACEA manages parts of the following funding programmes: 
 Erasmus+
 Creative Europe
 European Solidarity Corps
 Citizens, Equality, Rights and Values (CERV)
 Intra-Africa Academic Mobility Scheme
Additionally, EACEA supervises the Eurydice network (producing analysis and comparable data on education systems and policies in Europe) and the Youth Wiki (an online encyclopedia of national youth policies across Europe). EACEA also continues to manage projects funded during the 2014-2020 programming period. As of 1 February 2023, the Acting Director of EACEA is Sophie Beernaerts.

References

External links

 European Commission, official website
 EACEA website 
 About EACEA 
 How to get a grant 
 Scholarships 
 Programming period 2021-2027
 Programming period 2014-2020

Agencies of the European Union
2006 in the European Union
2021 in the European Union
Education in Europe
European Union youth policy
Government agencies established in 2006
Information technology organizations based in Europe
2006 establishments in Belgium
Organisations based in Brussels